Hop Alley may refer to:

 Chinatown, St. Louis
 Chinatown, Denver